Rani Khera is a village in Bachhrawan block of Rae Bareli district, Uttar Pradesh, India. As of 2011, its population is 2,042, in 460 households. It is located 6 km from Bachhrawan, the block headquarters, and the main staple foods are wheat and rice. It has one primary school and no healthcare facilities.

The 1961 census recorded Rani Khera as comprising 11 hamlets, with a total population of 702 people (364 male and 338 female), in 146 households and 135 physical houses. The area of the village was given as 960 acres.

The 1981 census recorded Rani Khera as having a population of 1,009 people, in 213 households, and having an area of 389.31 hectares.

References

Villages in Raebareli district